Lady with a Past is a 1932 American pre-Code romantic comedy film starring Constance Bennett as a shy and very proper young lady who decides to invent a scandalous past for herself to spice up her life. It is based on the novel of the same name by Harriet Henry.

Plot
Although she is an heiress and quite lovely, Venice Muir is very shy. She is flattered when flirtatious Donnie Wainwright urges her to elope to Paris with him, then irked when he abandons her before their ship departs.

Venice gets an idea, hiring a penniless fellow, Guy Bryson, to pretend to be a gigolo and spread word of Venice's effect on men. Soon she is the toast of Paris, suitors lining up to woo her, including Rene, a man of noble lineage. Unbeknownst to her, Rene is in serious debt. When she rejects his proposal, Rene commits suicide, enhancing Venice's reputation as a heartbreaking vixen.

Sailing back home, Venice is followed by more gossip, including some about Guy. A dazzled Donnie begins pursuing her again, finally winning over Venice without ever knowing of her ruse.

Cast
 Constance Bennett as Venice Muir
 Ben Lyon as Guy Bryson
 David Manners as Donnie Wainwright
 Don Alvarado as Carlos Santiagos
 Albert Conti as Rene, the Viscomte de la Thernardier
 Merna Kennedy as Ann Duryea
 Astrid Allwyn as Lola Goadby
 Don Dillaway as Jerry
 Blanche Friderici as Nora (as Blanche Frederici)
 John Roche as Carl Howe
 Cornelius Keefe as Spaulding
 Nella Walker as Aunt Emma

Reception
According to RKO records the film lost $140,000.

References

External links
 
 
 
 

1932 films
American romantic comedy films
American black-and-white films
Films based on American novels
1932 romantic comedy films
Films directed by Edward H. Griffith
RKO Pictures films
1930s English-language films
1930s American films